Phytoliriomyza is a genus of leaf miner flies in the family Agromyzidae. There are at least twenty described species in Phytoliriomyza.

Species

 Phytoliriomyza arctica (Lundbeck, 1901)
 Phytoliriomyza beckerella Spencer, 1981
 Phytoliriomyza clara (Melander, 1913)
 Phytoliriomyza conjunctimontis (Frick, 1952)
 Phytoliriomyza conspicua (Sehgal, 1968)
 Phytoliriomyza consulta Spencer, 1986
 Phytoliriomyza dorsata (Siebke, 1864)
 Phytoliriomyza felti (Malloch, 1914)
 Phytoliriomyza flavens Spencer, 1981
 Phytoliriomyza floridana Spencer, 1973
 Phytoliriomyza fumicosta (Malloch, 1914)
 Phytoliriomyza hilarella (Zetterstedt, 1848)
 Phytoliriomyza imperfecta (Malloch, 1934)
 Phytoliriomyza jacarandae Steyskal and Spencer, 1978
 Phytoliriomyza leechi Spencer, 1981
 Phytoliriomyza melampyga (Loew, 1869) (jewelweed leafminer)
 Phytoliriomyza minutissima Spencer, 1981
 Phytoliriomyza montana Frick
 Phytoliriomyza pacifica (Melander, 1913)
 Phytoliriomyza pallida (Sehgal, 1968)
 Phytoliriomyza perpusilla (Meigen, 1830)
 Phytoliriomyza pilosella Spencer, 1973
 Phytoliriomyza pulchella Spencer, 1986
 Phytoliriomyza varia (Melander, 1913)
 Phytoliriomyza viciae (Spencer, 1969)
 Phytoliriomyza volatilis Spencer, 1969

References

Further reading

 Diptera.info
 NCBI Taxonomy Browser, Phytoliriomyza
 

Agromyzidae
Opomyzoidea genera
Taxa named by Friedrich Georg Hendel